is a railway station on the Iiyama Line, East Japan Railway Company (JR East), in Hokushin in the village of Sakae, Shimominochi District, Nagano Prefecture, Japan.

Lines
Mori-Miyanohara Station is served by the Iiyama Line, and is 49.7 kilometers from the starting point of the line at Toyono Station.

Station layout
The station consists of one island platform connected to the station building by a level crossing. The station is staffed.

Platforms

History
Mori-Miyanohara Station opened on 19 November 1925.  With the privatization of Japanese National Railways (JNR) on 1 April 1987, the station came under the control of JR East. A new station building was completed in April 2004.

Passenger statistics
In fiscal 2017, the station was used by an average of 37 passengers daily (boarding passengers only).

Surrounding area
Sakae village hall

See also
 List of railway stations in Japan

References

External links

 JR East station information 

Railway stations in Nagano Prefecture
Iiyama Line
Railway stations in Japan opened in 1925
Sakae, Nagano